St. Mungo's may refer to:

St. Mungo's Cathedral, Glasgow  Glasgow Cathedral and The High Kirk of Glasgow
St Mungo's Hospital for Magical Maladies and Injuries from the Harry Potter books
St Mungo's (charity), London's largest homelessness charity